Total Sense Media (formerly Media Sound Holdings) is a company which was incorporated in 2005 and is based in Burgess Hill, East Sussex in the United Kingdom. As of 2015 it operates five radio stations in the South of England, and publishes two magazines.

In April 2008, Bright FM in Burgess Hill and 107.7 Splash FM in Worthing merged. The company later purchased Arrow FM and Sovereign FM from TLRC in June 2009.

In October 2012, it was announced that the company would merge with Isle of Wight Radio, alongside its Beacon magazine, reuniting Arrow FM and Sovereign FM with their former sister station under TLRC. The merger involved the Isle of Wight Radio's shareholders taking shares in Media Sound Holdings, with Claire Willis and Hedley Finn joining the board. It was confirmed that staffing would not be impacted at the station with continued broadcast from the Isle of Wight and no plans for content sharing amongst the stations, though it was stated this may be considered in future for off peak hours.

It was announced in December 2015 that the periodical publication Sussex Living, a glossy lifestyle and local news magazine, had been bought by Media Sound Holdings.

In April 2016, the group announced it was re-branding its four Sussex radio stations, Arrow FM, Bright FM, Sovereign FM and Splash FM to More Radio.

Radio stations

More Radio Hastings, formerly Arrow FM, which serves Hastings, Bexhill and Battle
More Radio Mid-Sussex, formerly Bright FM, which serves Burgess Hill, Haywards Heath and Lewes
More Radio Eastbourne, formerly Sovereign FM, which serves Eastbourne and Hailsham
More Radio Worthing, formerly Splash FM, which serves Worthing, Littlehampton and Shoreham by Sea
Isle of Wight Radio which serves the Isle of Wight

References

External links
 Official Website
 media.info entry for Total Sense Media

Radio broadcasting companies of the United Kingdom
Radio stations in Sussex